Said Pasha Kurd (Sulaymaniyah 183420 October 1907 Constantinople) was an Ottoman Kurdish statesman, son of Hussein Pasha of Sulaymaniyah.

Family 
He was the brother of Kurd Ahmet Izzet Pasha and brother in law of Mustafa Yamulki, father of Şerif Pasha and Kurd Fuad Pasha, and uncle to Abdul Aziz Yamulki.

Posts held 
After holding various administrative posts he became governor-general of the Archipelago (1881), minister for foreign affairs (1881), ambassador at Berlin (1883) and again foreign minister in 1885. He was afterwards president of the Council of State, an office which he held until his death.

References

Political office-holders in the Ottoman Empire
Kurdish people from the Ottoman Empire
Governors of the Ottoman Empire
Pashas
Said Pasha Kurd
Said Pasha Kurd
People from Sulaymaniyah
19th-century Kurdish people
20th-century Kurdish people
Ministers of Foreign Affairs of the Ottoman Empire
Ambassadors of the Ottoman Empire to Germany